The 2019–20 Tigres UANL season was the 52st season in the football club's history and the 22st consecutive season in the top flight of Mexican football.

Coaching staff

Players

Squad information

Players and squad numbers last updated on 18 July 2019.Note: Flags indicate national team as has been defined under FIFA eligibility rules. Players may hold more than one non-FIFA nationality.

Transfers

In

Out

Competitions

Overview

Campeón de Campeones

Torneo Apertura

League table

Results summary

Result round by round

Matches

Leagues Cup

Statistics

Squad statistics

Goals

Hat-tricks

Clean sheets

Disciplinary record

1 Includes 2019 Campeón de Campeones, 2019 Leagues Cup.

References

External links

Mexican football clubs 2019–20 season
Tigres UANL seasons